The Savala is a river in the Tambov and Voronezh oblasts of Russia. It is a right tributary of the Khopyor (a tributary of the Don). It flows over the southern part of the Oka–Don Lowland. Its main tributary is the Yelan. Most of the river's waters are from melting snow. It freezes over in late November, and stays icebound until the spring thaw starts in late March or early April. The town of Zherdevka is along the banks of the Savala.

References 

Rivers of Tambov Oblast
Rivers of Voronezh Oblast